(born March 10, 1967 in Narashino, Chiba) is a retired Japanese backstroke swimmer. He won a gold medal at the 1988 Summer Olympics in Seoul.

Swimming 
Suzuki developed the swimming technique called underwater dolphin kick or what is known as the Berkoff Blastoff in the United States. This style in backstroke swimming was invented by either David Berkoff or Jesse Vasallo. However, it was Suzuki who finally developed the skill, allowing him to swim 25 meters underwater at the 1984 Summer Olympics held in Los Angeles. Four years later, he won the gold medal in the 100-meter backstroke at the 1988 Seoul Olympics where Berkoff also competed.

Career 
In 2013, Daichi was the head of the Japan Swimming Federation. On September 5, 2015, it was confirmed that he would take up a new position as head of Japan's new national sports agency, which was launched on October 1, 2015. The new organization, which is called Japan Sports Agency, is an Incorporated Administrative Agency or similar of the Ministry of Education, Culture, Sports, Science and Technology. Its primary role is the coordination of a wide range of sports related functions and projects carried out by various government ministries. Specifically, the 121-person agency is tasked to improve Japan's athletic performance in the 2020 Summer Olympics in Tokyo.  On April 5, 2021, The International Swimming Hall of Fame (ISHOF) announced that Daichi Suzuki will be inducted into the ISHOF Class of 2021 as an "Honor Swimmer".
 In fact, Daichi Suzuki was announced by ISHOF that he would have been inducted into the ISHOF Class of 2020 in 2019, but due to the COVID-19 pandemic, the 2020 induction was postponed to 2021.

Educational background
Juntendo University

References

 databaseOlympics
 Hawaii Swim Forum – Race Strategy
 

1967 births
Living people
People from Narashino
Japanese male backstroke swimmers
Olympic swimmers of Japan
Swimmers at the 1984 Summer Olympics
Swimmers at the 1988 Summer Olympics
Olympic gold medalists for Japan
Asian Games medalists in swimming
Swimmers at the 1986 Asian Games
Sportspeople from Chiba Prefecture
Olympic gold medalists in swimming
Asian Games gold medalists for Japan
Medalists at the 1986 Asian Games
Universiade medalists in swimming
Universiade gold medalists for Japan
Medalists at the 1988 Summer Olympics
Japanese sportsperson-politicians
Medalists at the 1987 Summer Universiade
20th-century Japanese people
Presidents of the Japan Swimming Federation